Earth Game is a 1979 board game published by Fantasy Pastimes.

Gameplay
Earth Game is a cooperative game about managing the resources and solving the problems of the planet Earth.

Reception
Eric Paperman reviewed Earth Game in The Space Gamer No. 32. Paperman commented that "Simple yet enjoyable, this game could provide a welcome change of pace for those gamers tired of being ganged up on in multi-player games. However, gamers looking for a game filled with fighting, double-dealing, and all the other amenities of the average multi-player game will have to look elsewhere."

References

Board games introduced in 1979